Dyschirius darlingtoni is a species of ground beetle in the subfamily Scaritinae. It was described by Kult in 1950.

References

darlingtoni
Beetles described in 1950